The Madhiban, also known as Gaboye, are an artisanal caste among Somali people. They have been endogamous, and their traditional hereditary occupation has been as hunters.

They are also referred to as Midgaan, an appellation which is sometimes used pejoratively. The Madhiban have been one of the low status castes among the Somalis, along with Tumal and others.

Distribution and names

The Madhiban are a part of the Somali ethnic group found in East Africa, particularly in Somalia, Ethiopia, northeastern Kenya, and Djibouti.

Following the conquest of North Africa by Muslim Arabs in the 7th century CE, Islam spread throughout West Africa via merchants, traders, scholars, and missionaries, that is largely through peaceful means whereby African rulers either tolerated the religion or converted to it themselves. In this way, Islam spread across and around the Sahara Desert. In addition, the religion arrived in East Africa when Arab traders crossed the Red Sea and, in a second wave, settled along the Swahili Coast. Military campaigns did occur from the 14th century CE against the Christian kingdoms of Nubia and Madhibans who ruled part of Somalia especially the Land of Punt.  There were also sometimes violent resistance by supporters of traditional African beliefs such as Madhiban were followers of Waaq religion.

For at least a decade the Madhiban kingdom resisted the invasion of Islamic conquest and were finally defeated in mid 14th century.  After their defeat Madhibans fled to the rural place and become hunters and leatherworkers with other ritual and craft tasks performed for the majorities.

According to a 1960 count, they numbered around 20,000 out of 640,000 Somalis in parts of Somalia that were within the then British Protectorate. Their numbers in other parts of Somalia and other Somali regions were unknown.

The terms Madhiban, Midgan or Midgaan for this Somali caste are found in historic literature, but in modern discourse, the term Gaboye is increasingly common. This caste is distinct from the Tumal and Yibir outcast communities because each is accused of things different from each other in Somali society.

Discussion
The Madhiban were historically hunters, but now engage in occupations like leather work (shoemaking). They also are the traditional circumcision performers for both males, and females in the Somali society. These professions have traditionally been considered dirty, and the Madhiban have been a part of the sab or lower castes as opposed to the aji or upper castes.

According to Lee Gunderson, Dennis Murphy Odo and Reginald D'Silva, the Midgan have traditionally been treated as a low caste, scorned and reviled. A Midgan-Madiban has been deemed as polluting and therefore avoided as a taboo in the Somali society.

In 1890 Élisée Reclus, in his extensive work "The Earth and its Inhabitants: AFRICA" (Vol. IV, South and East Africa) described the Madhiban (Midgan) as follows:

Under Somalia's military administration, some Madhiban were appointed to positions within the government to promote integration. The Madhiban have since obtained wider political representation. Their general social status has also improved with the expansion of urban centers.

Law
Under the 1951 UN convention, several legal proceedings have ruled that Midgan as a low caste in Somalia are "akin to Dalits or the untouchables in India".

Cognate castes in East Africa
The Madhiban caste is not an exception limited to the Somali ethnic group, and equivalent cognate caste is found in numerous ethnic groups in East Africa. According to Donald Levine – a professor of Sociology specializing in Ethiopian and Horn of Africa studies, similar caste groups in different languages and ethnic groups have been integral part of societies of this region. These strata have featured all the defining characteristics of caste, states Levine, characteristics such as "endogamy, hierarchy, status, concepts of pollution, restraints on commensality, a traditional occupation and membership by birth". In eastern Ethiopia ethnic groups, such as the Oromo people, cognates to Somali castes have been recorded in 16th century texts, states Cornelius Jaenen. The table below illustrate some alternate terms for castes mirroring the Madhiban in other ethnic groups that share this region with the Somali people.

Notable Madhiban
 Maryam Mursal, Somali female singer
  Mohamed Sulayman Tubeec deceased,  Somali singer/songwriter
 Abdi Tahlil Warsame deceased,  Somali singer/songwriter
Omar dhuule Deceased,  Somali singer/songwriter
Shey Mire Dacar deceased,  Somali singer/songwriter
 Professor Ahmed Ashkir Botan Minister of Education in 1981 and a former Vice-Chancellor of the Somali National University.

Groups
In 2009, the Minneapolis Police Department of Minneapolis, Minnesota, reported that "Madhibaan with Attitude" was one of several Somali gangs active in the city.
Gaarhaye, also called Adone, was the ninth-largest of the eleven constitutive Darawiish administrative division; it was exclusively Madhiban

References

Bibliography
Hassan Ali Jama, Who cares about Somalia, (Verlag Hans Schiler: 2005)
I.M. Lewis, A pastoral democracy, (James Currey Publishers: 1999)

External links
 
 

Cushitic-speaking peoples
 
 
Ethnic groups in Ethiopia
Ethnic groups in Kenya
Castes
Muslim communities in Africa